Jandraka is a union council roughly 34 km away from Okara. It is situated on the Bank of River Ravi. Its population is approx. 12859 Nos. It has a big main bazar and adjacent bus stand. 

Union councils of Okara District